The 2017 Mississippi College Choctaws football team represented the Mississippi College in the 2017 NCAA Division II football season. They were led by fourth-year head coach John Bland. The Choctaws played their home games at Robinson-Hale Stadium and were members of the Gulf South Conference.

Schedule
Mississippi College announced its 2017 football schedule on June 19, 2017. The schedule consists of four home and six away games in the regular season. The Choctaws will host GSC foes Delta State, Florida Tech, Shorter, and West Georgia, and will travel to North Alabama, Valdosta State, West Alabama, and West Florida.

The Choctaws will travel to both non-conference games against Clark Atlanta of the Southern Intercollegiate Athletic Conference and Southwest Baptist of the Great Lakes Valley Conference.

References

Mississippi College
Mississippi College Choctaws football seasons
Mississippi College Choctaws football